Mowruiyeh or Muruiyeh or Moorooeyeh may refer to:
 Mowruiyeh, Jiroft
 Muruiyeh, Shahr-e Babak
 Muruiyeh, Zarand